Nandrool Khas is a village in the Kangra District of Himachal Pradesh

References

Villages in Kangra district